Føyka Stadion (also called Asker Stadion) is a sports stadium in Asker, Norway with running track. It is currently used mostly for association football matches, and is the home ground of Asker Fotball. The stadium has a capacity of 2,000.

1950 establishments in Norway
Football venues in Norway
Sport in Asker
Sports venues completed in 1950
Sports venues in Viken